The MV Loredan was an Italian mixed motor ship and auxiliary cruiser of the Italian Royal Navy in World War II, named in honour of the many admirals of the noble Loredan family of Venice.

Built in 1936 in Monfalcone, it initially served as a civil transport ship on several lines in the Adriatic Sea. In 1941 it was registered as an auxiliary cruiser in the Italian Royal Navy. In twenty-one months of service, it carried out a total of 193 missions, consisting mainly of escort services in the Tyrrhenian Sea.

On 10 April 1943, it left the port of Cagliari as an escort to a small convoy headed for the archipelago of La Maddalena. Shortly after the departure, the convoy was spotted by the British submarine HMS Safari, which proceeded to launch torpedoes at the Italian ships, sinking the Loredan with nearly all her crew.

The wreck of the Loredan lies on its left side, with the stern severely damaged, at a depth of between 52 and 67 meters, on the seabed of the Gulf of Cagliari, at 39°08' N and 9°23' E. Today, she is a frequent diving destination.

History

Construction and civil use 

Built between November 1935 and November 1936 in the Cantieri Riuniti dell'Adriatico in Monfalcone some time after its twin ship Narenta (built in Ancona), the unit was originally a small mixed motor ship of 1357 gross register tonnage and 626 net register tonnage. Two holds with a capacity of 1212 cubic meters allowed a deadweight of 583 (in other sources 650) tons, while the cabins could accommodate a total of 28 passengers, all in first class. A FIAT diesel engine with a power of 1600-1800 HP (in some sources 2200), consuming 6.6 tons of fuel per day, powered a propeller, allowing a speed of 13.5-14 knots (the initially expected speed was instead of 14.6 knots).

Registered with registration number 290 at the Maritime Compartment of Venice, the ship belonged to the Compagnia Adriatica di Navigazione, which on 1 January 1937 renamed as the Adriatica Società Anonima di Navigazione, based in Venice.

Initially used on line 45 Venice-Trieste-Fiume-Bari, the Loredan subsequently sailed also on lines 44, from Bari to Durrës, 42, from Venice to Durrës and Bari and vice versa, passing through Dalmatia, and 46, from Manfredonia to Bari.

On 1 February 1940 the motor ship was laid up in Venice, remaining there until 11 April of that year. Rearmed on 12 April, the ship resumed service on line 44 for about a month; then, from May 1940, it operated on the basis of provisions of the Ministry of the Navy, making extraordinary transport journeys on behalf of the government, alternating with moments of rest and partial decommissioning.

Military use in the Royal Italian Navy 
On 27 July 1941 the Loredan was requisitioned in Barletta by the Regia Marina and registered in the role of auxiliary ship of the State with registration number D 19, classified as an auxiliary cruiser. Armed with two 102/45 mm guns, four 20/65 mm machine guns and two anti-submarine bombers equipped with a stock of 21 depth bombs (other sources mention 20-21 mines), the motor ship was used for escorting convoys and transporting materials on secondary and less dangerous routes. Starting from 1942 the commander of the ship was the corvette captain Antonio Calegari. The journalist Vittorio Giovanni Rossi was also on board the Loredan, as a war correspondent (Rossi recounted this experience in the 1941 book The War of the Sailors).

In twenty-one months of service as an auxiliary cruiser, the Loredan carried out a total of 193 missions, consisting mainly of escort services on the routes that connected Sardinia to Civitavecchia.

Encounter with HMS Safari and sinking 
At four in the afternoon on 10 April 1943, the Loredan left the port of Cagliari as an escort to a small convoy headed for the archipelago of La Maddalena and formed by the military tanker Isonzo and the old steamship Entella, loaded with 3500 tons of coal. The auxiliary cruiser proceeded at the head of the convoy, followed by Entella and Isonzo, alongside which also sailed the small tug-minesweeper RD 29, another unit of the escort. Off Capo Boi, the MAS 507 joined the escort, after carrying out an unsuccessful hydrophone listening made problematic by the transit of the motor-sailer V 197 Idria. An anti-submarine reconnaissance squadron from the 188th Base Squadron at Elmas Airport, charged with patrolling the area in search of enemy underwater units, had to return early due to an engine failure, while an anti-submarine seaplane appointed to air escort the convoy remained on the ground due to starter engine failure.

Shortly after the departure the ships were spotted by the British submarine , which, after having maneuvered to approach and take a position suitable for attack, around 18:20h (in other sources at 18h or 18:25h) launched four torpedoes at the convoy, and then quickly dived underwater and moved away. The Italian units had just crossed the RD 41 tug-minesweeper a mile across Torre Finocchio (or Torre delle Stelle) when torpedo wakes were spotted from aboard the latter. Slashed at the stern by one of the weapons at 18:20, the Loredan sank within a few seconds, 12 miles at 100° from Punta Elia, not far from Cagliari, dragging almost all of the crew with her. Even the Isonzo, hit by a torpedo under the bridge and another in the stern, sank more slowly with the loss of 22 men, while the Entella avoided a torpedo but ended up accidentally running aground near the coast (according to another source it was hit and led aground to avoid sinking).

The RD 29, the RD 41 and the MAS 507, then joined by the Idria, carried out intense but unsuccessful anti-submarine hunts (being reached in the final stages also by a seaplane), believing they had sunk it, while in reality the Safari remained for several hours stuck on the seabed, and finally managed to free herself and move away.

Some survivors of the two sunken ships, despite the rough sea, reached the shore by swimming, others were recovered by the escort units and then loaded onto trucks and taken to Cagliari.

The following day, at eleven o'clock, the Safari, back on the spot, also sank the Entella with two torpedoes, which was being released with the use of tugs, divers and naval engineers. The submarine again evaded the hunt, conducted in this case by the MAS 507 and 510 and by a seaplane, and stopped at 17:50h after the supposed, but failed, sinking of the opposing unit.

The wreck of the Loredan lies on its left side, with the stern severely damaged, at a depth of between 52 and 67 meters, on the seabed of the Gulf of Cagliari, at 39°08' N and 9°23' E. She is a frequent diving destination.

References 

1936 ships

Auxiliary cruisers of the Regia Marina